Wilbert George Hogg (April 21, 1913 in Detroit, Michigan – November 5, 1973), was a professional baseball player who played third base in the Major Leagues for the 1934 Brooklyn Dodgers. He appeared in two games for the Dodgers on June 1 and June 2, recording one official at bat.

External links

1913 births
1973 deaths
Major League Baseball third basemen
Baseball players from Detroit
Brooklyn Dodgers players
Dayton Ducks players
Richmond Colts players
Savannah Indians players
Augusta Tigers players